Suljettu (1999) is an album by the Finnish rock group Absoluuttinen Nollapiste. It is a thematic concept album, telling the story of a father and a son living in a small, closed-minded Finnish town and is generally accepted as the group's masterpiece. Suljettu is Finnish for "closed".

Track listing
 "Kasvatus" (Aki Lääkkölä, Tommi Liimatta) – 2:23
 "Mihin" (Liimatta) – 3:07
 "Sukututkimus lannistaa (Liimatta) – 3:43
 "Portaat" (Aake Otsala) – 3:24
 "Kupit on kuin olisi häät" (Otsala, Liimatta, Lääkkölä) – 2:57
 "Esinekeräilyn hitaus" (Liimatta) – 2:34
 "Täällä on joku" (Liimatta) – 3:18
 "Joutomaa" (Otsala) – 3:19
 "Joen silmille" (Liimatta) – 3:08
 "Tungos on lavaste" (Liimatta) – 5:25
 "Kiilakivi" (Liimatta) – 2:40
 "Suvannossa ylpeä ilme I-V" (Liimatta) – 20:46

Personnel

 Tommi Liimatta - Guitar, Vocals
 Aki Lääkkölä - Guitar
 Aake Otsala - Bass Guitar, Vocals
 Tomi Krutsin - Drums, Vocals
 Teemu Eskelinen - Percussions, Vocals
 Juuso Nordlund - Engineer, Mixing
 Otto Hallamaa - Engineer, Mixing
 Mika Jussila - Mastering Engineer

References

External links
  Album entry at band's official website

Absoluuttinen Nollapiste albums
1999 albums
Concept albums